Shadscale scrub is a plant community and vegetation type that occurs in upper elevations of the Mojave Desert and lower elevations of the Great Basin ecoregion or biome, characterized by salt tolerant plants—halophytes.

It is located at higher elevations than the saltbush scrub plant community, but shares some of its plant species.

Flora
The shadscale scrub vegetation type commonly includes:
hop-sage (Grayia spinosa)
winter fat (Krascheninnikovia lanata).

Shared members with higher elevation saltbush scrub include: 
goosefoot family (Chenopodiaceae) members
four-wing saltbrush (Atriplex canescens
shadscale (Atriplex confertifolia)
cattle spinach, or all-scale (Atriplex polycarpa).

Other species can include:
Calochortus excavatus — Inyo County star tulip.

See also
Saltbush scrub plant community

References

.
.
Plant communities of California
Halophytes